The Newport Deanery is a Roman Catholic deanery in the Archdiocese of Cardiff that covers several churches in Newport and Monmouthshire, Wales.

The dean is centred at St Gabriel's Church in Ringland, Newport. Also in the deanery is the All Saints Parish, which comprises St Anne's Church, Ss Basil and Gwladys Church, St David's  Church, St David Lewis Church, St Mary's Church and St Michael's Church, in Newport.

Churches
St Mary, Chepstow
St Paul, Caldicot - served from Chepstow
St Anne, Malpas, in the All Saints Parish
Saints Basil and Gwladys, Rogerstone, in the All Saints Parish
St David, Maesglas, in the All Saints Parish
St David Lewis, Bettws, in the All Saints Parish
St Mary, Stow Hill, in the All Saints Parish
St Michael's Church, Pillgwenlly, in the All Saints Parish
St Gabriel, Ringland
Saints Julius, Aaron and David, Caerleon - served from St Gabriel
St Patrick's, Newport - served by the Rosminians

Gallery

References

External links
 All Saints Parish site
 St Patrick's Parish site
 St Mary Church Chepstow site

Newport, Wales
Roman Catholic Deaneries in the Archdiocese of Cardiff